Tom Miles (born November 3, 1979) is a member of the Mississippi House of Representatives, representing the 75th district (Rankin County and Scott County). Miles is a graduate of Morton High School and Mississippi State University. As a college student, Miles opened a business to pay for his own education.

In 2013, Miles announced a plan to introduce truth-in-labeling laws, which would require country of origin labels for chicken. In 2019 Miles tweeted in favor of a new license plate design which includes the phrase "In God We Trust," after freedom from religion advocates threatened to sue the state over the design.

Miles is a Sunday School teacher at Forest Baptist Church; a member of the Rankin, Scott, and Forest County Chambers of Commerce; the president of Friends of Roosevelt State Park; and a first responder for the Scott County Search and Rescue team.

References

External links 

Legislative page

Living people
Democratic Party members of the Mississippi House of Representatives
1979 births
People from Morton, Mississippi
Mississippi State University alumni
21st-century American politicians